According to 1 Kings 20:1–34 and 2 Kings 6:8–7:16, the Israelite–Aramean War was an armed conflict between the Israelites and the Arameans and Amorites that took place in the Levantine regions of Aram and Bashan. It is generally considered to have taken place around the year 874 BCE. The war resulted in a victory for the Israelites and saw the Kingdom of Israel conquer the Biblical city of Golan, a vital landmark that is widely believed to have historically stood on the site of the village of Saham al-Jawlan in modern-day Syria.

Conflict and figure estimates 
The Israelites had initially planned to invade and conquer Golan to halt Aramean military offensives that were being carried out from that region. However, they came into conflict with the Amorites in a battle for control over all of the strategic land in Bashan.

Following their victory against the Amorites in Bashan, the Israelites invaded Aram to subdue the Arameans. The Aramean monarch Ben-Hadad I led a fierce standoff between his Kingdom of Aram-Damascus and the invading forces of the Kingdom of Israel; there are no reliable estimates for both sides' casualties, but some sources put Aramean casualties as high as 127,000 troops. The conflict saw the Israelite king Ahab crush the Arameans and successfully take over the Golan to complete Israel's later conquests.

See also

Israeli Arameans, a Syriac Christian group who claim descent from the ancient Arameans and reside in the modern-day State of Israel

References 

Military history of Asia
Hebrew Bible battles
History of the Middle East
9th century BC
9th-century BC conflicts
Omrides
Wars of ancient Israel